Punta Sal is a coastal village located along the Pacific Ocean in the region of Tumbes, northern Peru. Due to its more equatorial location, the current of El Niño warms the surrounding sea and the local climate. Punta Sal's ample beaches, with whitish sands and blue warm waters have made this area a popular beach resort.

Geography 
Punta Sal is considered the longest beach in the northern Peruvian coast. Its 6.5 km of length are divided in two sectors: Punta Sal Chica (a slightly curved shore, encased between two small capes, with white sands) and Punta Sal Grande (a longer beach with less whitish sands). Water temperature is warm (24 °C) all year round; waters are also calm the whole year.

See also
Tumbes Department
Contralmirante Villar Province
Canoas de Punta Sal District

References

External Links

Beaches of Peru
Populated places in the Tumbes Region